The 275th Infantry Division (275. Infanterie-Division) was an infantry division of the  German Army during World War II.

Divisional history 

The 275th was formed in late 1943, in France, from remnants of the 223rd Infantry Division. It was commanded by Generalleutnant Hans Schmidt from 10 December 1943 until it was disbanded on 22 November 1944.

Early in the Normandy landings, (June 6, 1944) two Infantry battalions, the Fusilier battalion, one artillery battalion and an engineer company were sent to the Normandy area. The rest of the division followed in mid July.

The 275th suffered heavy losses in the Falaise pocket and was transferred to Aachen for refitting. Here it was re-enforced with the Luftwaffe fortress battalions XII and XX. The 275th was transferred to the Düren - Hürtgenwald area where it suffered severe losses and was disbanded. The remnants forming the 344th Infantry Division.

The 275th Infantry Division was reformed in January 1945, near Flensburg, and was transferred to the Eastern front where it was destroyed in the Halbe pocket in 1945.

Order of battle 

The following is the 275th order of battle in mid-1944;

 Grenadier Regiment 983
 Grenadier Regiment 984
 Grenadier Regiment 985
 Panzerjäger Abteilung 275
 Artillerie Regiment 275
 Pioniere Battalion 275
 Fusilier Battalion 275
 Supply Train / Signals Troops 275

References 

Infantry divisions of Germany during World War II
Military units and formations established in 1943
Military units and formations disestablished in 1945